Kimberly A. Alexander (born November 26, 1961) is an American politician and Democratic member of the Georgia House of Representatives, serving since 2012. Alexander defeated Republican former state Representative Bob Snelling to take the seat.

References

External links
 
 Biography at Ballotpedia
 Legislative page
 Twitter account

Living people
Democratic Party members of the Georgia House of Representatives
21st-century American politicians
21st-century American women politicians
Women state legislators in Georgia (U.S. state)
1961 births